Roșiori is a commune located in Bihor County, Crișana, Romania. It is composed of three villages: Mihai Bravu (Félegyházi Újtelep), Roșiori and Vaida (Biharvajda).

References

Communes in Bihor County
Localities in Crișana